University College Capital() is one of eight new regional organizations of different study sites in Denmark offering bachelor courses of all kinds in Copenhagen and North Zealand.

Profession School UCC was formed by the merger of Greater Copenhagen CVU and CVU Copenhagen & North Zealand.

From 1 January 2008, these organizations have joined in a multi-professional education organization whose primary mission is to provide professionsbachelor education and training to public and private sectors. Originally named Profession Copenhagen School - University College Copenhagen.

Professionsbachelor Courses 
Profession School UCC offers seven different professions bachelor courses:

 Teacher;
 Pedagogue; 
 Nurses; 
 Physiotherapist; 
 Relaxation Pedagogue; 
 Textile retailer; 
 Sign Language and MHS-interpreter.

Training 
Profession School UCC offers courses, diploma courses and completion of further training courses in the educational and health professional field and in the leadership and guidance.

External links 
Professionshøjskolen UCC's hjemmeside

Colleges in Denmark
Universities in Denmark